11 Comae Berenices is a binary star system in the northern constellation of Coma Berenices, located in the sky, east and slightly north of Denebola in Leo, but not nearly as far east as ε Virginis in Virgo. It is about a degree from the elliptical galaxy M85 and two degrees north of the spiral galaxy M100. It is visible to the naked eye as a faint, orange-hued star with an apparent visual magnitude of 4.72. This body is moving away from the Sun with a heliocentric radial velocity of +44 km/s.

The primary component is an aging K-type giant star with a stellar classification of K0 III. It is a low metallicity star with an iron abundance about half that of the Sun. At the age of  1.5 billion years old with 1.7 times the mass of the Sun, it has exhausted the hydrogen at its core and expanded to 15.8 times the Sun's radius. The star is radiating 110 times the luminosity of the Sun from its swollen photosphere at an effective temperature of 4,670 K. It has a magnitude 12.9 companion star at an angular separation of  along a position angle of 44°, as of 2007.

A substellar companion was discovered orbiting the primary star in 2007 using the radial velocity method. The object's mass is well within the range of deuterium-fusing brown dwarfs.

References

G-type giants
Binary stars
Planetary systems with one confirmed planet
Coma Berenices
Durchmusterung objects
Comae Berenices, 11
107383
060202
4697